BeOS R5.1d0 or Dano/EXP (also known as  EXP, Dano,  and incorrectly as Dan0/EXP or Dan0) is the build codename and most commonly used name to refer to a leaked R5.1 prerelease of the Be Operating System. Dano's build date is 15 November 2001, the day of Be Inc.'s closure. Dano features an improved network stack called BONE, initial support for 802.11b wireless networking, some 3D acceleration-capable graphics drivers, a redesigned graphical user interface, a replacement USB subsystem with USB mass storage support, and other improvements. Many of these features had been promised for BeOS R5 a year earlier and not delivered.

In a potential move towards releasing the system as open source software, many proprietary items had been removed: the MP3 encoder was replaced with LAME, and OpenSSL replaced the RSA Encryption Engine in the NetPositive web browser.

The ZETA operating system was initially based on the Dano codebase, though it has since evolved.

External links 

 BeOS R5.1d0 version information
 Historical BeOS version information

BeOS

ru:BeOS#BeOS R5.1d0